Gal Brael (born 15 June 1990) is an Israeli former footballer who played as a central defender.

Notes

1990 births
Living people
Israeli footballers
Hapoel Nir Ramat HaSharon F.C. players
F.C. Ashdod players
Hapoel Petah Tikva F.C. players
Hapoel Acre F.C. players
Hapoel Ra'anana A.F.C. players
Maccabi Bnei Reineh F.C. players
Hapoel Qalansawe F.C. players
Liga Leumit players
Israeli Premier League players
Footballers from Ramat HaSharon
Association football defenders